Wilcox Medical Center is part of Hawaii Pacific Health's network. One of Kauai island's three hospitals, Wilcox Medical Center provides Kauai residents with an imaging center, emergency department, and surgical center.

History
George Norton Wilcox and Dora Isenberg planned a community hospital with a staff open to all eligible physicians on Kauai. It was built at a cost of $200,000. More than 1,000  Kauai residents attended the ceremony, and 15 days later the new 96-bed hospital accepted its first patients.

Periodic expansion programs continued over the years. The first expansion took place from 1955 to 1958 with the addition of a kitchen, an obstetrical wing, medical library, conference room and additional space for laboratory and X-ray departments. Another milestone was reached in 1966 with the advent of the Outpatient Department built adjacent to the main hospital. Plantation dispensaries were phased out at this time and the eastside physicians began practice in the facilities, later forming the Kauai Medical Group Inc.

The third expansion was completed in August 1971 and resulted in the present $4.2 million Acute Patient Care Tower and Special Diagnostic and Treatment Facility. A laboratory and physical therapy building opened in 1977.

Since then, remodeling and renovation has been ongoing to accommodate the hospital's many new services and programs, which includes an Intensive Care Unit, Coronary Care Unit and a CT and MRI facility in the Imaging Department, which was renovated and expanded to include more exam space and updated equipment. In 2005, the department was named the Wilcox Family Imaging Center after the Wilcox family of Kauai.

Wilcox Medical Center treated surfer Bethany Hamilton after she lost her arm to a  tiger shark off the north shore of Kauai.

In 2010, the Wilcox Health Women's Center opened to provide preventive and diagnostic care for Kauai's women.

In 2016, Wilcox Memorial Hospital rebranded itself as Wilcox Medical Center.

References

External links 
 

Hospital buildings completed in 1938
Hospital buildings completed in 1971
Hospitals in Hawaii
Kauai County, Hawaii
1938 establishments in Hawaii
Hospitals established in 1938